Mohammad-Sadegh Salehimanesh is an Iranian cleric and politician. He was founder and commander of the Vali Amr Corps, responsible for the security of the Supreme Leader of Iran, from 1986 to 1993 and subsequently held several offices in the Ministry of Intelligence before being appointed as the governor of Qom Province under President Hassan Rouhani.

References

Living people
Governors of Qom Province
People of the Ministry of Intelligence (Iran)
Iranian Shia clerics
Islamic Revolutionary Guard Corps clerics
Voice of Nation politicians
Islamic Revolution Committees personnel
Year of birth missing (living people)